Parmotrema tinctorum is a lichen which belongs to the Parmotrema genus. The lichen is as known as the Palm Ruffle Lichen and is listed as secure by the Nature Conservatory.

Description 
Grows to around 3–30 cm in diameter with board dull smooth slightly shiny gray lobes that are 10–20 mm wide. The underside is black with naked brown areas with a central collection of simple rhizines.

Habitat and range 
Global distribution with a majority of samples being located in North America and Europe.

Chemistry 
Compounds derived from Parmotrema tinctorum have been found to have anti-cancer properties.

Environmental monitoring
Parmotrema tinctorum has been identified and used as a candidate for monitoring air pollution.

See also 

 List of Parmotrema species

References 

Lichen species
tinctorum